Gert Coetzer ( – 10 November 2018), also known by the nickname of "Oupa" (meaning "Old Man" in Afrikaans), was a South African rugby union and professional rugby league footballer who played in the 1950s and 1960s.

Background
Gert Coetzer was born in Bloemfontein, South Africa, he worked as a waterworks superintendent in Yorkshire , he bred and showed German Shepherds , including the champion; "Vanda" , he died aged 79 in South Africa, and his funeral service took place at Nederduitse Gereformeerde Gemeente (Dutch Reformed Church) in Doornpoort, North East Pretoria, South Africa on Wednesday 14 November 2018.

Playing career

International honours
Gert Coetzer took part in a trial match for the South Africa (RU) (commonly known as the Springboks), he represented Other Nationalities (RL) while at Wakefield Trinity, he played , i.e. number 5, in the 2-19 defeat by St. Helens at Knowsley Road, St. Helens on Wednesday 27 January 1965, to mark the switching-on of new floodlights, represented Commonwealth XIII (RL) while at Wakefield Trinity in 1965 against New Zealand at Crystal Palace National Recreation Centre, London on Wednesday 18 August 1965, and was selected for the South Africa (RL) squad to play in the 1963 tour of Australia. Unfortunately, he sustained a dislocated shoulder during the opening tour match against Monaro south of Canberra, and took no further part in the tour, and as South Africa (RL) played no further internationals in this era, there were no further opportunities to win international caps.

Championship final appearances
Gert Coetzer played , i.e. number 5, and scored two tries in Wakefield Trinity's 21-9 victory over St. Helens in the Championship Final replay during the 1966–67 season at Station Road, Swinton on Wednesday 10 May 1967, and played , i.e. number 2, in the 17-10 victory over Hull Kingston Rovers in the Championship Final during the 1967-68 season at Headingley Rugby Stadium, Leeds on Saturday 4 May 1968.

Challenge Cup Final appearances
Gert Coetzer played , i.e. number 5, and scored 2-tries in Wakefield Trinity's 25-10 victory over Wigan in the 1962–63 Challenge Cup Final during the 1962–63 season at Wembley Stadium, London on Saturday 11 May 1963, in front of a crowd of 84,492, and played left-, i.e. number 4, in the 10-11 defeat by Leeds in the 1967–68 Challenge Cup "Watersplash" Final during the 1967–68 season at Wembley Stadium, London on Saturday 11 May 1968, in front of a crowd of 87,100.

County Cup Final appearances
Gert Coetzer played , i.e. number 5, in Wakefield Trinity's 18-2 victory over Leeds in the 1964–65 Yorkshire County Cup Final during the 1964–65 season at Fartown Ground, Huddersfield on Saturday 31 October 1964.

Club career
Gert Coetzer transferred from rugby union to rugby league with Wakefield Trinity during February 1963, he made his debut for Wakefield Trinity during March 1963, and he played his last match for Wakefield Trinity during the 1967–68 season.

Genealogical information
Gert Coetzer was married to Laurika (née Viljoen). They had children; Derek Coetzer (birth registered during first ¼  in Dewsbury district).

References

External links
Search for "Coetzer" at rugbyleagueproject.org
Free State Rugby Saddened By The Loss Of An Ex Free State Player
Gert 'Oupa' Coetzer
SA Rugby League Springboks who toured Australia in 1963
Rugby League Final 1963
Rugby Cup Final 1968
Search for "Gert Coetzer" at britishnewspaperarchive.co.uk
Search for "Oupa Coetzer" at britishnewspaperarchive.co.uk

1930s births
2018 deaths
Expatriate rugby league players in England
Other Nationalities rugby league team players
Rugby league centres
Sportspeople from Bloemfontein
Rugby league players from Free State
Rugby league wingers
Rugby union players from Bloemfontein
Rugby union wings
South African expatriate rugby league players
South African expatriate sportspeople in England
South African rugby league players
South African rugby union players
Wakefield Trinity players
White South African people
Year of birth missing